Panayot Panayotov (born 1951) is a Bulgarian pop singer whose emotive songs of the 1980s and 1990s were often featured on national TV. The major themes of his songs were romantic love and – to a lesser extent – separation, loss and nostalgia.

External links 
 Discography and news items at bgestrada.com

Bulgarian pop singers
1951 births
Living people